FestivalandCo is a literary festival held in Paris, France at the Shakespeare and Company bookstore.

Sylvia Whitman founded the festival which has hosted such writers as Paul Auster, Siri Hustvedt, Jeanette Winterson, David Hare, Jung Chang, and Marjane Satrapi.

References

External links

Literary festivals in France
Festivals in Paris
Biennial events